Gurū Nānak (15 April 1469 – 22 September 1539; Gurmukhi: ਗੁਰੂ ਨਾਨਕ; pronunciation:), also referred to as  ('father Nānak'), was the founder of Sikhism and is the first of the ten Sikh Gurus. His birth is celebrated worldwide as Guru Nanak Gurpurab on Katak Pooranmashi ('full-moon of Kattak'), i.e. October–November.

Nanak is said to have travelled far and wide across Asia teaching people the message of ik onkar, who dwells in every one of his creations and constitutes the eternal Truth. With this concept, he would set up a unique spiritual, social, and political platform based on equality, fraternal love, goodness, and virtue.

Nanak's words are registered in the form of 974 poetic hymns, or shabda, in the holy text of Sikhism, the Guru Granth Sahib, with some of the major prayers being the Japji Sahib (ji and sahib are suffixes signifying respect); the Asa di Var ('ballad of hope'); and the Sidh Gosht ('discussion with the Siddhas'). It is part of Sikh religious belief that the spirit of Nanak's , divinity, and religious authority had descended upon each of the nine subsequent Gurus when the Guruship was devolved on to them.

Biography

Birth 

Nanak was born on 15 April 1469 at Rāi Bhoi Kī Talvaṇḍī village (present-day Nankana Sahib, Punjab, Pakistan) in the Lahore province of the Delhi Sultanate, although according to one tradition, he was born in the Indian month of Kārtik or November, known as Kattak in Punjabi.

Most janamsakhis, or traditional biographies of Nanak, mention that he was born on the third day of the bright lunar fortnight, in the Baisakh month (April) of Samvat 1526. These include the Puratan ('traditional' or 'ancient') janamsakhi, Miharban janamsakhi, Gyan-ratanavali by Bhai Mani Singh, and the Vilayat Vali janamsakhi. The Sikh records state that Nanak died on the 10th day of the Asauj month of Samvat 1596 (22 September 1539 CE), at the age of 70 years, 5 months, and 7 days. This further suggests that he was born in the month of Vaisakh (April), not Kattak (November).

Kattak birthdate 

In as late as 1815, during the reign of Ranjit Singh, the festival commemorating Nanak's birthday was held in April at the place of his birth, known by then as Nankana Sahib. However, the anniversary of Nanak's birth—the Gurpurab (gur + )—subsequently came to be celebrated on the full moon day of the Kattak month in November. The earliest record of such a celebration in Nankana Sahib is from 1868 CE.

There may be several reasons for the adoption of the Kattak birthdate by the Sikh community. For one, it may have been the date of Nanak's enlightenment or "spiritual birth" in 1496, as suggested by the Dabestan-e Mazaheb.

The only janamsakhi that supports the Kattak birth tradition is that of Bhai Bala. Bhai Bala is said to have obtained Nanak's horoscope from Nanak's uncle Lalu, according to which, Nanak was born on a date corresponding to 20 October 1469 CE. However, this janamsakhi was written by Handalis—a sect of Sikhs who followed a Sikh-convert known as Handal—attempting to depict the founder as superior to Nanak. According to a superstition prevailing in contemporary northern India, a child born in the Kattak month was believed to be weak and unlucky, hence why the work states that Nanak was born in that month.

Bhai Gurdas, having written on a full-moon-day of the Kattak month several decades after Nanak's death, mentions that Nanak had "obtained omniscience" on the same day, and it was now the author's turn to "get divine light."

According to Max Arthur Macauliffe (1909), a Hindu festival held in the 19th century on Kartik Purnima in Amritsar attracted a large number of Sikhs. The Sikh community leader Giani Sant Singh did not like this, thus starting a festival at the Sikh shrine of the Golden Temple on the same day, presenting it as the birth anniversary celebration of Guru Nanak.

Macauliffe also notes that Vaisakh (March–April) already saw a number of important festivals—such as Holi, Rama Navami, and Vaisakhi—therefore people would be busy in agricultural activities after the harvest festival of Baisakhi. Therefore, holding Nanak's birth anniversary celebrations immediately after Vaisakhi would have resulted in thin attendance, and therefore, smaller donations for the Sikh shrines. On the other hand, by the Kattak full moon day, the major Hindu festival of Diwali was already over, and the peasants—who had surplus cash from crop sales—were able to donate generously.

Family and early life 
Nanak's parents, including father Kalyan Chand Das Bedi (commonly shortened to Mehta Kalu) and mother Mata Tripta, were both Hindu Khatris and employed as merchants. His father, in particular, was the local patwari (accountant) for crop revenue in the village of Talwandi.

According to Sikh traditions, the birth and early years of Nanak's life were marked with many events that demonstrated that Nanak had been blessed with divine grace. Commentaries on his life give details of his blossoming awareness from a young age. For instance, at the age of five, Nanak is said to have voiced interest in divine subjects. At age seven, his father enrolled him at the village school, as per custom. Notable lore recounts that, as a child, Nanak astonished his teacher by describing the implicit symbolism of the first letter of the alphabet, resembling the mathematical version of one, as denoting the unity or oneness of God. Other stories of his childhood refer to strange and miraculous events about Nanak, such as the one witnessed by Rai Bular, in which the sleeping child's head was shaded from the harsh sunlight by, in one account, by the stationary shadow of a tree or, in another, by a venomous cobra. 

Nanaki, Nanak's only sister, was five years older than him. In 1475, she married and moved to Sultanpur. Jai Ram, Nanaki's husband, was employed at a modikhana (a storehouse for revenues collected in non-cash form), in the service of the Delhi Sultanate's Lahore governor Daulat Khan, at which Ram would help Nanak get a job. Nanak moved to Sultanpur, and started working at the modikhana around the age of 16.

As a young man,
Nanak married Sulakhani, daughter of Mūl Chand (aka Mula)
and Chando Raṇi.
They were married on 24 September 1487, in the town of Batala, and would go on to have two sons, Sri Chand and Lakhmi Chand (or Lakhmi Das). Nanak lived in Sultanpur until c. 1500, which would be a formative time for him, as the puratan janamsakhi suggests, and in his numerous allusions to governmental structure in his hymns, most likely gained at this time.

Final years 

Around the age of 55, Nanak settled in Kartarpur, living there until his death in September 1539. During this period, he went on short journeys to the Nath yogi centre of Achal, and the Sufi centres of Pakpattan and Multan. By the time of his death, Nanak had acquired several followers in the Punjab region, although it is hard to estimate their number based on the extant historical evidence. The followers of Nanak were called Kartārīs (meaning 'the people who belonged to the village of Kartarpur') by others.

Guru Nanak appointed Bhai Lehna as the successor Guru, renaming him as Guru Angad, meaning "one's very own" or "part of you". Shortly after proclaiming his successor, Guru Nanak died on 22 September 1539 in Kartarpur, at the age of 70. According to Sikh hagiography, Guru Nanak's body was never found. When the quarreling Hindus and Muslims tugged at the sheet covering Nanak’s body, they found instead a heap of flowers—and so Nanak’s simple faith would, in course of time, flower into a religion, beset by its own contradictions and customary practices.

Odysseys (Udasis) 

During first quarter of the 16th century, Nanak went on long udasiya ('journeys') for spiritual pursuits. A verse authored by him states that he visited several places in "nau-khand" ('the nine regions of the earth'), presumably the major Hindu and Muslim pilgrimage centres.

Some modern accounts state that he visited Tibet, most of South Asia, and Arabia, starting in 1496 at age 27, when he left his family for a thirty-year period. These claims include Nanak's visit to Mount Sumeru of Indian mythology, as well as Mecca, Baghdad, Achal Batala, and Multan, where he would debate religious ideas with opposing groups. These stories became widely popular in the 19th and 20th century, and exist in many versions.

In 1508, Nanak visited the Sylhet region in Bengal. The janamsakhis suggest that Nanak visited the Ram Janmabhoomi temple in Ayodhya in 1510–11 CE.

The Baghdad inscription remains the basis of writing by Indian scholars that Guru Nanak journeyed in the Middle East, with some claiming he visited Jerusalem, Mecca, Vatican, Azerbaijan and Sudan.

Disputes 
The hagiographic details are a subject of dispute, with modern scholarship questioning the details and authenticity of many claims. For example, Callewaert and Snell (1994) state that early Sikh texts do not contain such stories. From when the travel stories first appear in hagiographic accounts of Guru Nanak, centuries after his death, they continue to become more sophisticated as time goes on, with the late phase Puratan version describing four missionary journeys, which differ from the Miharban version.

Some of the stories about Guru Nanak's extensive travels first appear in the 19th-century Puratan janamsakhi, though even this version does not mention Nanak's travel to Baghdad. Such embellishments and insertion of new stories, according to Callewaert and Snell (1993), closely parallel claims of miracles by Islamic pirs found in Sufi tadhkirahs of the same era, giving reason to believe that these legends may have been written in a competition.

Another source of dispute has been the Baghdad stone, bearing an inscription in a Turkish script. Some interpret the inscription as saying Baba Nanak Fakir was there in 1511–1512; others read it as saying 1521–1522 (and that he lived in the Middle East for 11 years away from his family). Others, particularly Western scholars, argue that the stone inscription is from the 19th century and the stone is not a reliable evidence that Guru Nanak visited Baghdad in early 16th century. Moreover, beyond the stone, no evidence or mention of Guru Nanak's journey in the Middle East has been found in any other Middle Eastern textual or epigraphical records. Claims have been asserted of additional inscriptions, but no one has been able to locate and verify them.

Novel claims about his travels, as well as claims such as Guru Nanak's body vanishing after his death, are also found in later versions and these are similar to the miracle stories in Sufi literature about their pirs. Other direct and indirect borrowings in the Sikh janamsakhis relating to legends around Guru Nanak's journeys are from Hindu epics and puranas, and Buddhist Jataka stories.

Posthumous biographies 

The earliest biographical sources on Nanak's life recognised today are the janamsakhis ('birth stories'), which recount the circumstances of the guru's birth in great detail.

Gyan-ratanavali is the janamsakhi attributed to Bhai Mani Singh, a disciple of Guru Gobind Singh who was approached by some Sikhs with a request that he should prepare an authentic account of Guru Nanak's life. As such, it is said that Bhai Mani Singh wrote his story with the express intention of correcting heretical accounts of Guru Nanak.

One popular janamsakhi was allegedly written by a close companion of the Guru, Bhai Bala. However, the writing style and language employed have left scholars, such as Max Arthur Macauliffe, certain that they were composed after his death. According to such scholars, there are good reasons to doubt the claim that the author was a close companion of Guru Nanak and accompanied him on many of his travels.

Bhai Gurdas, a scribe of the Guru Granth Sahib, also wrote about Nanak's life in his vars ('odes'), which were compiled some time after Nanak's life, though are less detailed than the janamsakhis.

Teachings and legacy 

Nanak's teachings can be found in the Sikh scripture Guru Granth Sahib, as a collection of verses recorded in Gurmukhi.

There are three competing theories on Guru Nanak's teachings. The first, according to Cole and Sambhi (1995, 1997), based on the hagiographical Janamsakhis, states that Nanak's teachings and Sikhism were revelations from God, and not a social protest movement, nor an attempt to reconcile Hinduism and Islam in the 15th century.

The second theory states that Nanak was a Guru, not a prophet. According to Singha (2009): Sikhism does not subscribe to the theory of incarnation or the concept of prophet hood. But it has a pivotal concept of Guru. He is not an incarnation of God, not even a prophet. He is an illumined soul.
The third theory is that Guru Nanak is the incarnation of God. This has been supported by many Sikhs including Bhai Gurdas, Bhai Vir Singh, Santhok Singh and is supported by the Guru Granth Sahib. Bhai Gurdas says:
ਗੁਰ ਪਰਮੇਸਰੁ ਇਕੁ ਹੈ ਸਚਾ ਸਾਹੁ ਜਗਤੁ ਵਣਜਾਰਾ।

The Guru and God are one; He is the true master and the whole world craves for Him.
Additionally in the Guru Granth Sahib it is stated:
ਨਾਨਕ ਸੇਵਾ ਕਰਹੁ ਹਰਿ ਗੁਰ ਸਫਲ ਦਰਸਨ ਕੀ ਫਿਰਿ ਲੇਖਾ ਮੰਗੈ ਨ ਕੋਈ ॥੨॥

O Nanak, serve the Guru, the Lord Incarnate; the Blessed Vision of His Darshan is profitable, and in the end, you shall not be called to account. ||2||

Guru Ram Das says: 
ਗੁਰ ਗੋਵਿੰਦੁ ਗੋੁਵਿੰਦੁ ਗੁਰੂ ਹੈ ਨਾਨਕ ਭੇਦੁ ਨ ਭਾਈ ॥੪॥੧॥੮॥

The Guru is God, and God is the Guru, O Nanak; there is no difference between the two, O Siblings of Destiny. ||4||1||8||

The hagiographical Janamsakhis were not written by Nanak, but by later followers without regard for historical accuracy, containing numerous legends and myths created to show respect for Nanak. In Sikhism, the term revelation, as Cole and Sambhi clarify, is not limited to the teachings of Nanak. Rather, they include all Sikh Gurus, as well as the words of men and women from Nanak's past, present, and future, who possess divine knowledge intuitively through meditation. The Sikh revelations include the words of non-Sikh bhagats (Hindu devotees), some who lived and died before the birth of Nanak, and whose teachings are part of the Sikh scriptures.

The Adi Granth and successive Sikh Gurus repeatedly emphasised, suggests Mandair (2013), that Sikhism is "not about hearing voices from God, but it is about changing the nature of the human mind, and anyone can achieve direct experience and spiritual perfection at any time." Guru Nanak emphasised that all human beings can have direct access to God without rituals or priests.

The concept of man as elaborated by Guru Nanak, states Mandair (2009), refines and negates the "monotheistic concept of self/God," where "monotheism becomes almost redundant in the movement and crossings of love." The goal of man, taught the Sikh Gurus, is to end all dualities of "self and other, I and not-I," attaining the "attendant balance of separation-fusion, self-other, action-inaction, attachment-detachment, in the course of daily life."

Guru Nanak, and other Sikh Gurus emphasised bhakti ('love', 'devotion', or 'worship'), and taught that the spiritual life and secular householder life are intertwined. In the Sikh perspective, the everyday world is part of an infinite reality, where increased spiritual awareness leads to increased and vibrant participation in the everyday world. Guru Nanak described living an "active, creative, and practical life" of "truthfulness, fidelity, self-control and purity" as being higher than the metaphysical truth.

Through popular tradition, Nanak's teaching is understood to be practised in three ways:

 Vand Shhako: Share with others, help those who are in need, so you may eat together;
 Kirat Karo ('work honestly'): Earn an honest living, without exploitation or fraud; and
 Naam Japo: Meditate on God's name, so to feel His presence and control the five thieves of the human personality.

Legacy 
Guru Nanak Dev Ji is the founder of Sikhism. The fundamental beliefs of Sikhism, articulated in the sacred scripture Guru Granth Sahib, include faith and meditation on the name of the one creator; unity of all humankind; engaging in selfless service, striving for social justice for the benefit and prosperity of all; and honest conduct and livelihood while living a householder's life.

The Guru Granth Sahib is worshipped as the supreme authority of Sikhism and is considered the final and perpetual guru of Sikhism. As the first guru of Sikhism, Guru Nanak contributed a total of 974 hymns to the book.

Influences 
Many Sikhs believe that Guru Nanak's message was divinely revealed, as his own words in Guru Granth Sahib state that his teachings are as he has received them from the Creator Himself. The critical event of his life in Sultanpur, in which he returned after three days with enlightenment, also supports this belief.

Many modern historians give weight to his teachings' linkage with the pre-existing bhakti, sant, and wali of Hindu/Islamic tradition. Scholars state that in its origins, Guru Nanak and Sikhism were influenced by the nirguni ('formless God') tradition of the Bhakti movement in medieval India. However, some historians do not see evidence of Sikhism as simply an extension of the Bhakti movement. Sikhism, for instance, disagreed with some views of Bhakti saints Kabir and Ravidas.

The roots of the Sikh tradition are perhaps in the sant-tradition of India whose ideology grew to become the Bhakti tradition. Fenech (2014) suggests that: Indic mythology permeates the Sikh sacred canon, the Guru Granth Sahib and the secondary canon, the Dasam Granth and adds delicate nuance and substance to the sacred symbolic universe of the Sikhs of today and of their past ancestors.

In the Bahá'í Faith

In a letter, dated 27 October 1985, to the National Spiritual Assembly of the Bahá'ís of India, the Universal House of Justice stated that Guru Nanak was endowed with a "saintly character" and that he was: ...inspired to reconcile the religions of Hinduism and Islám, the followers of which religions had been in violent conflict.... The Bahá'ís thus view Guru Nanak as a 'saint of the highest order'.

In Hinduism

Guru Nanak is highly influential amongst Sindhi Hindus, where the majority follow Nanakpanthi teachings.

In popular culture
 A Punjabi movie was released in 2015 named Nanak Shah Fakir, which is based on the life of Guru Nanak, directed by Sartaj Singh Pannu and produced by Gurbani Media Pvt. Ltd.
 Allegory: A Tapestry of Guru Nanak's Travels is a 2021–22 docuseries about Guru Nanak's travels in nine different countries.

Places visited

Uttarakhand
 Gurudwara Reetha Sahib, Champawat, Uttrakhand
 Nanakmatta

Andhra Pradesh
 Gurudwara Pehli Patshahi Guntur, Andhra Pradesh

Bihar
 Gurdwara Sri Guru Nanak Sheetal Kund – Rajgir
 Patna

Delhi
 Gurdwara Nanak Piao, Delhi
 Gurudwara Majnu Ka Tila, Delhi

Gujarat
 Gurdwara Pehli Patshahi, Lakhpat, Gujarat

Haryana
 Panipat

Jammu and Kashmir
 Hari Parbat, Srinagar

Punjab
 Gurudwara Shri Ber Sahib, Sultanpur Lodhi
 Gurudwara Shri Hatt Sahib, Sultanpur Lodhi
 Gurudwara Shri Kothri Sahib, Sultanpur Lodhi
 Gurudwara Shri Guru Ka Bagh, Sultanpur Lodhi
 Gurudwara Shri Sant Ghat, Sultanpur Lodhi
 Gurudwara Shri Antaryamta, Sultanpur Lodhi
 Dera Baba Nanak
 Gurudwara Manji Sahib, Kiratpur Sahib
 Achal Batala.

Sikkim
 Gurudwara Nanak Lama, Chungthang, Sikkim
 Gurudongmar Lake

Odisha
 Gurdwara Guru Nanak Datan Sahib, Cuttack, Odisha
 Gurdwara Bauli Math Sahib, Puri, Odisha

Pakistan
 Nankana Sahib
 Gurdwara Darbar Sahib Kartarpur, Kartarpur
 Gurdwara Sacha Sauda, Farooqabad
 Sultanpur Lodhi
 Gurdwara Rori Sahib, Gujranwala
 Gurdwara Beri Sahib, Sialkot
 Gurdwara Panja Sahib, Hasan Abdal
 Gurudwara Chowa Sahib, Rohtas Fort
 Narowal

Bangladesh
 Gurdwara Nanak Shahi, Dhaka

Afghanistan
 Gurduara Baba Nanak Dev Ji, Jalalabad
 Chashma Sahib Patshahi Pahili, Jalalabad

Iran
 Gurudwara Pehli Patshahi, Mashhad

Iraq
 Baba Nanak Shrine, Baghdad

Sri Lanka
 Gurudwara Pehli Patshahi Batticaloa
 Koti, now known as Kotikawatta

Saudi Arabia
 Mecca
 Medina

See also 

 Nanakpanthi
 Fatehabad, Punjab
 List of places named after Guru Nanak Dev
 Bebe Nanaki
 Guru Gobind Singh

Notes

Citations

Bibliography

External links and Further reading 
 Singh, Sahib. Guru Nanak Dev and His Teachings.

 sikh-history.com

1469 births
1539 deaths
15th-century religious leaders
Founders of religions
History of Punjab
History of Sikhism
Miracle workers
People from Nankana Sahib District
Punjab
Punjabi people
Nanak